In mathematics, in the field of topology, a topological space is said to be locally Hausdorff if every point has an open neighbourhood that is a Hausdorff space under the subspace topology.

Examples and sufficient conditions

 Every Hausdorff space is locally Hausdorff.
 There are locally Hausdorff spaces where a sequence has more than one limit. This can never happen for a Hausdorff space.
 The line with two origins is locally Hausdorff (it is in fact locally metrizable) but not Hausdorff.
 The etale space for the sheaf of differentiable functions on a differential manifold is not Hausdorff, but it is locally Hausdorff.
 A T1 space need not be locally Hausdorff; an example of this is an infinite set given the cofinite topology.
 Let  be a set given the particular point topology. Then  is locally Hausdorff at precisely one point. From the last example, it will follow that a set (with more than one point) given the particular point topology is not a topological group.
 If  is a topological group that is locally Hausdorff at some point  then  is Hausdorff.

Properties

Every locally Hausdorff space is T1.

See also

 , a Hausdorff space where every continuous function from the space into itself has a fixed point.

References

Separation axioms